Tomás González (born Medellin, 1950) is a Colombian writer. He studied philosophy at the Universidad Nacional de Colombia. He is best known for his debut novel In the Beginning Was the Sea (1983) which was translated into English by Frank Wynne and published by  Pushkin Press. The translation was shortlisted for the Independent Foreign Fiction Prize. González lived in the United States for twenty years before returning to his native Colombia in 2002.

He is the nephew of the writer Fernando Gonzalez.

References

1950 births
Living people
Colombian male novelists
20th-century male writers
20th-century Colombian novelists
Colombian expatriates in the United States
21st-century Colombian novelists
21st-century male writers
Colombian male short story writers
Colombian short story writers
20th-century short story writers
21st-century short story writers
Colombian male poets
20th-century Colombian poets
National University of Colombia alumni